Koiak 27 - Coptic Calendar - Koiak 29

The twenty-eighth day of the Coptic month of Koiak, the fourth month of the Coptic year. On a common year, this day corresponds to December 24, of the Julian Calendar, and January 6, of the Gregorian Calendar. This day falls in the Coptic season of Peret, the season of emergence. This is the last day of the Nativity Fast, it is referred to as the Nativity Paramoun. On this day the fasting rule is more stringent.

Commemorations

Saints 

 The martyrdom of 150 men and 24 women from the city of Ansena

Other commemorations 

 The Paramoun of the Holy Nativity Feast 
 The Grand Opening of the Cathedral of the Nativity, in the New Administrative Capital

References 

Days of the Coptic calendar